James Wallace (born 29 August 2000) is a Scottish professional footballer who plays as a forward for Brora Rangers. He made his League debut for Ross County against Partick Thistle in the Scottish Championship, coming on as a substitute for Josh Mullin.

Career 
In September 2020, after departing Ross County earlier in the year, Wallace signed with Scottish Championship club Greenock Morton. He joined Scottish League One side Dumbarton on loan in March 2021.

Career statistics

References

Living people
2000 births
Ross County F.C. players
Association football forwards
Scottish Professional Football League players
Scottish footballers
Footballers from Inverness
Greenock Morton F.C. players
Dumbarton F.C. players
Highland Football League players